The 1983–84 Liga Artzit season saw Hapoel Haifa win the title and promotion to Liga Leumit. Hapoel Kfar Saba and Hapoel Petah Tikva were also promoted.

Hapoel Beit She'an, Hapoel Nazareth Illit and Hapoel Beit Shemesh were all relegated to Liga Alef.

Final table

References
1983-84 Hapoel Petah Tikva Museum 

Liga Artzit seasons
Israel
2